Tennis was contested at the 1978 Asian Games in Bangkok, Thailand from December 10 to December 19, 1978. Tennis had doubles and singles events for men and women, as well as a mixed doubles competition.

Indonesia dominated the competition, finishing first in medal table with 3 gold medals.

Medalists

Medal table

See also
 Tennis at the Asian Games

References

 Asian Games Roll of Honour (1962-2006)

External links
 OCA website

 
1978 Asian Games events
1978
Asian Games
1978 Asian Games